Qianshan District is a district of the city of Anshan, Liaoning province, People's Republic of China.

Administrative divisions
There are two subdistricts and seven towns.

Subdistricts:
Jiubao Subdistrict
Dagushan Subdistrict

Towns:
East Anshan
Tangjiafang
Dagushan
Qianshan Town
Qidashan
Songsantaizi
Ningyuan

References

External links

County-level divisions of Liaoning
Anshan